Seyyed Sharif (also Romanized as Seyyed Sharīf) is a village in Jahad Rural District, Hamidiyeh District, Ahvaz County, Khuzestan Province, Iran. At the 2006 census, its population was 81, in 17 families.

References 

Populated places in Ahvaz County